Zambodia is the only studio album by the American experimental music ensemble Motherhead Bug. It was released on October 15, 1993, by Pow Wow Records. The record is dedicated to Masami Shinoda, a Japanese alto-saxophonist and composer who died the year prior to its release.

Background
After the release of Consumer Revolt and its coinciding tour, David Ouimet left Cop Shoot Cop to pursue his own musical ambitions. He formed Motherhead Bug along with Railroad Jerk bassist Tony Lee sometime during 1989. As the band developed and more musicians joined they began to release vinyl EPs. Their first official release Raised By Insects...Bugview was issued in 1991, featuring production by J. G. Thirlwell and an early version of the song "My Sweet Milstar". The next year the band released Age of Drawfs on PCP Entertainment, which contained "Bleating Heart Incident".

Music
Motherhead Bug was known to incorporate elements of cabaret, big band, marching band, nursery rhymes, gypsy jazz, music hall, and even New York noise rock music into their work. Zambodia has been described as  having a worldly and anarchistic sound, comparable to the French music group Les Négresses Vertes. David Ouimet has attributed his background in classical as well as his work in the New York underground as being influential to his music. Martin Bisi, who produced the album, has discussed the bands importance as the first rock ensemble to fully incorporate Eastern European influences into their music, preceding bands such as Gogol Bordello.

Release and reception
The album is currently out of print, however it can be purchased in mp3 form from online stores such as amazon.com.

One Trouser Press critic described the album as follows: "The instrumentation and Ouimet's theatrical vocals lend a decadent grandeur to Weill-esque numbers like 'Demon Erection' and 'My Sweet Milstar.' It may be burlesque, but it's still pretty scary stuff."

Track listing

Personnel
Adapted from the Zambodia liner notes.

Motherhead Bug
Jez Aspinall – drums [mid], vocals (9)
April Chung – violin, oboe
Jim Colarusso – trumpet
Julia Kent – cello
Tony Lee – bass guitar, guitar (10), design
Cyril Mazard – drums [low]
Steve McMillen – guitar
David Ouimet – vocals, trombone, illustrations
Steve Ovenden – drums, percussion, backing vocals
Joe Ben Plummer – saxophone
Tomoyo T.L. – piano, gong, design

Additional musicians and production
Michele Amar – backing vocals
Martin Bisi – production, backing vocals
Reilly Bones – glockenspiel (4, 11), xylophone (4, 11)
Chris Gehringer – mastering
Brenda Nasse – accordion (4)
Adam Nodelman – bass (4)
Murray Weinstock – accordion (4, 9)
Norman Westberg – guitar (1, 2)

Release history

References

External links
 

1993 debut albums
Motherhead Bug albums
Albums produced by Martin Bisi